James Irving Burns (August 10, 1843 Biddeford, York County, Maine – December 17, 1925) was an American lawyer and politician from New York.

Life
He was the son of Jeremiah Burns (died 1874) and Aphia (Dennett) Burns (died 1901). The family removed to Yonkers, New York, in the 1850s. He attended Colgate University in 1859 and 1860. He graduated from Union College in 1862, and from Columbian College Law School.

He was secretary and treasurer of Rutgers Female College (located on Fifth Avenue in New York City) for seven years; and superintendent of Bonded Warehouses of the Port of New York from 1874 to 1884. Then he became manager of the Knickerbocker Subscription Agency, and president of the Spring Creek and Rockerville Water and Mining Company of South Dakota.

He was an alderman of Yonkers in 1883 and 1884; and a member of the New York State Assembly (Westchester Co., 1st D.) in 1887, 1888, 1890 and 1895.

He was a member of the New York State Senate (22nd D.) from 1896 to 1898, sitting in the 119th, 120th and 121st New York State Legislatures.

Sources
 RUTGERS FEMALE COLLEGE in NYT on June 23, 1876
 Biographical sketches of the members of the Legislature in The Evening Journal Almanac (1888)
 Sketches of the members of the Legislature in The Evening Journal Almanac (1895; pg. 58)
 The New York Red Book compiled by Edgar L. Murlin (published by James B. Lyon, Albany NY, 1897; pg. 137f, 404, 506ff and 512)
 Obituary Notes; Mrs. APHIA DENNETT BURNS... in NYT on April 15, 1901

1843 births
1925 deaths
Republican Party New York (state) state senators
People from Yonkers, New York
Republican Party members of the New York State Assembly
George Washington University Law School alumni
Union College (New York) alumni
Colgate University alumni
Politicians from Biddeford, Maine